Year 1482 (MCDLXXXII) was a common year starting on Tuesday (link will display the full calendar) of the Julian calendar.

Events 
 January–December 
 January 19 – A Portuguese fleet, commanded by Diogo de Azambuja, arrives at the mouth of the River Benya on the Gold Coast, where the fort of São Jorge da Mina (Elmina Castle) is erected.
 January 25 – Probable first printing of the Torah, in Bologna.
 February 28 –The village of Alhama de Granada in Spain is taken by Christian forces, starting the Granada War to expel the Moors from the Iberian Peninsula back to Africa. 
 February – Johann Reuchlin leaves Stuttgart to visit Florence where he meets Marsilio Ficino.
 March 22 – Pope Sixtus IV, in a special bulla, grants self-government rights to the Italian town of Ascoli Piceno.
 March 27 – The death of Mary of Burgundy triggers the first of the Flemish revolts against Maximilian of Austria.
 April 3 – Symeon I succeeds Maximus III as Ecumenical Patriarch of Constantinople.
 c. August – Portuguese navigator Diogo Cão becomes the first European to enter the Congo.
 August 1 – Anglo-Scottish Wars: Richard, Duke of Gloucester invades Scotland, and captures Edinburgh.
 August 24 – Capture of Berwick: The Scots surrender the border town of Berwick-upon-Tweed to Richard, ending his campaign.

 December 23 – Treaty of Arras divides the Burgundian Netherlands between King Louis XI of France and Archduke Maximilian I of Habsburg.

 Date unknown 
 Ivan III renounces the Mongol Khanate rule over Russia.
 Johannes Trithemius becomes a novice, at the abbey of St. Martin at Sponheim, in the Diocese of Mainz.
 The first edition of Euclid's Elements (Latin translation) is printed, by German printer Erhard Ratdolt in Venice, incorporating geometric diagrams.
 Schreierstoren is erected in Amsterdam (from which Henry Hudson will set sail on April 4, 1609, on the vessel Halve Maen, to bring him to the harbor of New York and the Hudson River).

Births 
 March 7 – Fray Thomas de San Martín, Roman Catholic prelate and bishop (d. 1555)
 June 29 – Maria of Aragon, Queen of Manuel I of Portugal, daughter of Ferdinand II of Aragon and Isabella I of Castile (d. 1517)
 July 7 – Andrzej Krzycki, Polish archbishop (d. 1537)
 August 23 – Jo Gwang-jo, Korean philosopher (d. 1520)
 October 7 – Ernest, Margrave of Baden-Durlach (d. 1553)
 October 18 – Philipp III, Count of Hanau-Lichtenberg (d. 1538)
 December 9 – Frederick II, Elector Palatine (1544–1556) (d. 1556)
 date unknown
Richard Aertsz, Dutch historical painter (d. 1577)
 Eufrasia Burlamacchi, Italian nun and manuscript illumination artist (d. 1548)
Leo Jud, Swiss religious reformer (d. 1542)
Johannes Oecolampadius, German religious reformer (d. 1531)
Matthias Ringmann, German cartographer and humanist poet (d. 1511)
 probable
 Bernardino Luini, Italian painter (d. 1532)
 Richard Pace, English diplomat (d. 1537)

Deaths 
 March 25 – Lucrezia Tornabuoni, Italian writer, adviser and spouse of Piero di Cosimo de' Medici (b. 1427)
 March 27 – Mary of Burgundy, Sovereign Duchess regnant of Burgundy, married to Maximilian I, Holy Roman Emperor (b. 1457)
 May 10 – Paolo dal Pozzo Toscanelli, Italian mathematician and astronomer (b. 1397)
 May 23 – Mary of York, daughter of King Edward IV of England (b. 1467)
 August 15 – William, Margrave of Hachberg-Sausenberg, Margrave of Hachberg-Sausenberg (1428-1441) (b. 1406)
 August 25 – Queen Margaret of Anjou, wife of Henry VI of England (b. 1430)
 August 29 – Queen Yun, Korean Queen (b. 1455)
 September 10 – Federico da Montefeltro, Italian mercenary (b. 1422)
 September 17 – William III, Landgrave of Thuringia, Duke of Luxembourg (b. 1425)
 September 22 – Philibert I, Duke of Savoy (b. 1465)
 date unknown – Hugo van der Goes, Flemish artist (b. c. 1440)

In fiction 
 In Doctor Who, the Doctor states that 1482 is a hard year to time travel to, as it is full of glitches.
 Victor Hugo's novel The Hunchback of Notre-Dame takes place in this year.

References